Seriatopora is a genus of colonial stony corals in the family Pocilloporidae. They are commonly known as needle corals, birdsnest corals or finger corals. They are native to the Red Sea, the Indo-Pacific region and some parts of the Central Pacific Ocean.

Characteristics
Members of this genus form small bushes with anastomising (linking) branches. The branch tips are sharply tapered and the growth forms are variable, depending on the level of light and the movement of water. The corallites are arranged in neat rows and the polyps only extend at night. The colour of these corals can be yellow, orange, pink, green or brown.

Species
The following species are listed in the World Register of Marine Species (WoRMS):
 Seriatopora aculeata Quelch, 1886
 Seriatopora caliendrum Ehrenberg, 1834
 Seriatopora dentritica Veron, 2000
 Seriatopora guttata Veron, 2000
 Seriatopora hystrix Dana, 1846
 Seriatopora octoptera Ehrenberg, 1834
 Seriatopora stellata Quelch, 1886

References

Pocilloporidae
Taxa named by Jean-Baptiste Lamarck
Scleractinia genera